Khaled Al-Eid (born January 2, 1969) is a Saudi Arabian equestrian who won a bronze medal in individual jumping at the 2000 Summer Olympics.

References

External links
 DatabaseOlympics.com
 Peter Harrigan and Rosalind Mazzawi, Great Leaps: Saudi Arabia’s First Olympic Medals, 2001, Saudi Aramco World
 

1969 births
Living people
Saudi Arabian male equestrians
Equestrians at the 1996 Summer Olympics
Equestrians at the 2000 Summer Olympics
Olympic equestrians of Saudi Arabia
Olympic bronze medalists for Saudi Arabia
Olympic medalists in equestrian
Medalists at the 2000 Summer Olympics
Equestrians at the 1994 Asian Games
Equestrians at the 2006 Asian Games
Equestrians at the 2010 Asian Games
Equestrians at the 2018 Asian Games
Asian Games gold medalists for Saudi Arabia
Asian Games bronze medalists for Saudi Arabia
Asian Games medalists in equestrian
Medalists at the 2006 Asian Games
Medalists at the 2010 Asian Games
Medalists at the 2018 Asian Games
21st-century Saudi Arabian people